Cristino Alberto Gómez Luciano (born 1987) is a Dominican poet, agronomist, and professor. Author of Ha vuelto el agua, Yo dije el amor, and other books.

Early life
Cristino Gómez grew up in Fondo Grande, a community in the municipality Loma de Cabrera of Dominican Republic. He started to write poetry early, initially motivated by the work of the Dominican poet Manuel Rueda.

Work and Trajectory

Cristino's verses, inspired on nature, homeland, and the beloved, "invite to appreciate beauty" and introduce "love symbolized in nature".

His poems have been published both printed and online, including blogs, magazines, newspapers and literary webs.  Some of his writings are included in poetry anthologies, including Mil Poemas a Neruda, in tribute to Chilean Nobel laureate poet Pablo Neruda, and the Antología del Poeta y Artista Virtual. In 2007 he was awarded the W.K. Kellog award of poetry of EARTH University, and, in 2008, his blog was honored as Distinguished Dominican Literary Blog at the International Book Fair of Santo Domingo. Currently, Cristino is teacher and the coordinator of the School of Agronomy of the Instituto Politécnico Loyola, and professor at the Instituto Especializado de Estudios Superiores Loyola. In December 2020, Luys Bien released Firme Albor, an EP of five songs based on poems written by Cristino Gómez. Later, in 2021, the singer also released two singles, Aún Te Amo and Déjame Nacer, written by Gómez Luciano.

Publications

Poetry 
  (2014)
  (2010)
 (2010)
  (2010)
  (2010)

Other

Prizes 

  Premio de Poesía Biblioteca W.K. Kellog 2007 for "Ha vuelto el agua" 
 Blog Distinguido de la Literatura Dominicana at the Feria Internacional del Libro Santo Domingo 2008.

References

External links
Official blog
 GoogleScholar Profile
 BioEconomista e Poeta Cristino Gomez Ospite a Sant'Anna
 Cristino Alberto Gómez (some poems)
 Interview for TIG

21st-century Dominican Republic poets
Dominican Republic male poets
1987 births
Living people
Agronomists
Dominican Republic literature
People from Loma de Cabrera
21st-century male writers